Victor Lindsey Arbuthnot Campbell  (20 August 1875 – 19 November 1956) was an English Royal Navy officer and Antarctic explorer.

Career

Terra Nova expedition 
In 1910, he was first officer on the Terra Nova expedition by Robert Falcon Scott. After arriving in Antarctica in January 1911, his role was to lead an eastern party of six men to explore and carry out scientific work in King Edward VII Land, to the east of the Barrier. After failing to find a suitable landing site on the King Edward VII Land shore, Campbell decided to sail to Victoria Land. On its return westward, Terra Nova encountered Roald Amundsen's expedition camped in the Bay of Whales, an inlet in the Barrier.

After returning to Cape Evans and informing Scott of Amundsen's location, Campbell's party were renamed the "Northern Party" and set off again, sailing northwards and put ashore at Robertson's Bay, near Cape Adare. They built a hut and wintered at Cape Adare but due to the sea ice conditions were unable to fulfil much of their intended summer explorations. However, they only had sledging provisions for six weeks with the intention of completing the geological work in a couple of weeks.

After the work was done they were left with rations for about four weeks. It was not anticipated the ship would have trouble picking them up as arranged in February but Terra Nova could not reach them due to heavy pack ice. Unable to connect with their ship, the Northern Party was forced to winter in Antarctica again. The party built an ice cave on Inexpressible Island where they spent the winter in miserable conditions, supplementing their rations by killing scarce seal and penguins. After learning of the death of Scott and the entire Polar party, as the senior remaining naval officer, Campbell assumed command of the expedition for its final weeks.

First World War 
During the First World War, Campbell fought as commander of the Drake Battalion in the Dardanelles campaign at Gallipoli—where he received the Distinguished Service Order (DSO)—the Battle of Jutland and the Zeebrugge Raid on board  in 1918.

Campbell served in the Dover Patrol and sank a U-boat by ramming it, for which he was awarded the bar to his DSO. In his further service with the Royal Navy, he reached the rank of captain.

Later life and death 
During the winter of 1918–1919, Campbell was posted to Murmansk in North Russia during the Archangel campaign, having been recommended by fellow Antarctic explorer Sir Ernest Shackleton to help instruct British forces in the use of Arctic equipment. For this work he was appointed an Officer of the Order of the British Empire.

Campbell emigrated to the Dominion of Newfoundland in 1922. He died in 1956 and was buried at Montgomerie Street Catholic Cemetery in Corner Brook.

References

Footnotes

Sources

External links 
 
 

1875 births
1956 deaths
Companions of the Distinguished Service Order
English emigrants to Canada
Explorers of Antarctica
Officers of the Order of the British Empire
People from Brighton
Royal Navy officers
Royal Navy officers of World War I
Terra Nova expedition